John Wade (1788–1875), author, was an industrious writer connected with the press throughout his career. He contributed to many periodicals, and was an esteemed leader-writer on The Spectator when that paper was under Robert Stephen Rintoul's editorship between 1828 and 1858.

As an author his greatest success was ‘The Black Book, or Corruption Unmasked! Being an Account of Persons, Places, and Sinecures,’ 1820–3, 2 vols. Published by Effingham Wilson, and brought out when the reform excitement was commencing, it produced a considerable sensation, and fifty thousand copies were sold. With some alterations in the title, it was reproduced in 1831, 1832, and 1835.

In 1826 he wrote for Longmans ‘The Cabinet Lawyer: a Popular Digest of the Laws of England,’ the twenty-fifth edition of which appeared in 1829. Another popular work was ‘British History, chronologically arranged,’ 1839; supplement 1841; 3rd edit. 1844; 5th edit. 1847. Effingham Wilson paid Wade so much a week for years while he was compiling the ‘British History,’ and supplied him with all the necessary works of reference.

Wade also edited an annotated ‘Junius, including Letters by the same Writer under other signatures,’ (1850, in Bohn's ‘Standard Library,’ 2 vols.). Here he was out of his depth, and the imperfections of his edition, and especially of his introduction, were pointed out by Charles W. Dilke in the ‘Athenæum’ of 2 Feb. et seq. Literature he did not find a profitable employment, and his main dependence in his later years was a civil-list pension of 50l., granted to him on 19 June 1862 by Lord Palmerston, chiefly on the representations of Effingham Wilson.

He was a vice-president of the historical section of the Institution d'Afrique of Paris.

He died at Chelsea on 29 Sept. 1875, and was buried in Kensal Green cemetery on 2 Oct.

References

Link to his books
The Black Book, or Corruption Unmasked   https://archive.org/details/blackbookorcorru02wadeuoft

1788 births
1875 deaths
19th-century British writers
Burials at Kensal Green Cemetery